Kooloth Valappil Dhanesh (born 13 February 1973) is a former Indian International football player who played as a defender. Born in Kerala, he started his career at the age of 19 in 1994 and later captained the national side at the 2002 FIFA World Cup qualifiers. He has played for the clubs like JCT Phagwara, East Bengal and FC Kochin. Dhanesh was temporarily suspended from  the  Cannanore District Football Association for manhandling a referee in a local match in 2013.

Honours

India
SAFF Championship: 1997; runner-up: 1995
 South Asian Games Gold medal: 1995; Bronze medal: 1999

References

Indian footballers
India international footballers
Malayali people
Footballers from Kerala
1973 births
Living people
Association football defenders
East Bengal Club players
Footballers at the 1998 Asian Games
Asian Games competitors for India
South Asian Games medalists in football
South Asian Games gold medalists for India
South Asian Games bronze medalists for India